Laila Brenden (born 1956) is a Norwegian author. She was born in Oslo, and now lives in Jessheim. She has written the Hannah series of novels, which were released between 2003 and 2010, as well as several non-fiction books for children.

References 

1956 births
Living people
Norwegian children's writers
Writers from Oslo
People from Jessheim
Date of birth missing (living people)
Norwegian women children's writers
20th-century Norwegian women writers